The threadtail anthias (Tosana niwae) is a species of marine ray-finned fish, an anthias from the subfamily Anthiinae part of the family Serranidae, the groupers and sea basses. It is the only member of the genus Tosana. It is found in the Western Pacific Ocean from Japan to the South China Sea in deep coastal waters over sandy-muddy substrates.

References 

Anthiinae
Fish described in 1906